El precio de tu amor (The Price of Your Love), is a Mexican telenovela produced by Ernesto Alonso for Televisa in 2000. Eduardo Santamarina and Eugenia Cauduro as the protagonists, while Yadhira Carrillo star as the antagonists.

Plot 
Antonio Ríos is a mechanical Noble who has just inherited a fortune, but Sandra's niece who gave inheritance conquer try to take his inheritance from his uncle, Gabriela secretary accompanies Sandra, she and Antonio are in love but Sandra wonder the price his Love

Cast 
 Eugenia Cauduro as Gabriela Galván
 Eduardo Santamarina as Antonio Ríos
 Yadhira Carrillo as Sandra Rangel
 Manuel Ojeda as Octavio Rangel
 Roberto Ballesteros as Rodolfo Galván 
 Macaria as Adelina
 Ninón Sevilla as Dalila
 Galilea Montijo as Valeria Ríos
 Alejandro Ávila as Guillermo San Miguel 
 Samuel Gallegos as Plutarco 
 Yolanda Ciani as Isabel
 Emilia Carranza as Yolanda
 Mariana Botas as Mary Ríos
 Rodrigo Rochet as Alejandro
 David Ramos as Carmelo
 Fernando Robles as Trinidad
 Lourdes Dechamps as Lolita
 Virginia Gimeno as La Chata
 Raquel Pankowsky as Meche
 María Prado as Doña Licha 
 Carlos Yustis as Policarpo
 Jaime Lozano as Don Benigno

References

External links 
 

2000 telenovelas
Mexican telenovelas
2000 Mexican television series debuts
2001 Mexican television series endings
Televisa telenovelas
Spanish-language telenovelas